Măgherani ( or colloquially Magyarós,) is a commune in Mureș County, Transylvania, Romania composed of three villages:
Măgherani
Șilea Nirajului / Nyárádselye
Torba / Torboszló

In 2004, Bereni, along with six other villages, broke away from Măgherani to form an independent commune.

History 

It formed part of the Székely Land region of the historical Transylvania province. Until 1918, the village belonged to the Maros-Torda County of the Kingdom of Hungary. After the Treaty of Trianon of 1920, it became part of Romania.

Demographics

The commune has an absolute Hungarian majority. According to the 2011 Census it has a population of 1,270 of which 92.91% or 1,180 are Hungarian.

See also 
 List of Hungarian exonyms (Mureș County)

References

Communes in Mureș County
Localities in Transylvania